Springfield Brick House, also known as Frenchwood, is a historic home located at Springfield, Hampshire County, West Virginia. It was built about 1855 and is a two-story, five bay, orange-red brick building with an L-shaped plan.  It features a three-bay front porch with a hipped roof supported by Doric order columns.  The house has a blend of Georgian and Greek Revival design elements. Also on the property is a contributing well.

It was listed on the National Register of Historic Places in 2013.

References

Houses on the National Register of Historic Places in West Virginia
Georgian architecture in West Virginia
Greek Revival houses in West Virginia
Houses completed in 1855
Houses in Hampshire County, West Virginia
National Register of Historic Places in Hampshire County, West Virginia
1855 establishments in Virginia